Hadlow Down Parish Council governs the village of Hadlow Down. The council appoints one councillor who is then known as the Chairman or Chairwoman. The current Chairperson is Councillor Sandra Richards.

Hadlow Down Parish Council comprises a single ward - this ward is represented by several parish councillors.

Clockwise, from the north, it borders the communities of Crowborough, Five Ashes, Heathfield, Buxted & Uckfield.

Current composition

Election history
Hadlow Down Parish Council is made up of up to 7 councillors elected from a single ward. The last elections were in 2015, and resulted in the election of 7 Independent councillors.

2015 election
The 2015 Hadlow Down Parish Council elections were held alongside the elections for Wealden District Council & the Wealden Parliamentary constituency on 7 May 2015. All 7 seats were up for election.

2011 election
In the 2011 Hadlow Down Parish Council elections only 7 of the 5 seats were contested, these seats were all won by independent candidates.

2007 election
In the 2007 Hadlow Down Parish Council elections an uncontested election occurred in which all 7 seats were filled by independents.

2003 election
In the 2003 Hadlow Down Parish Council elections an uncontested election occurred in which all 7 seats were filled by independents.

References

Parish councils of England
Local authorities in East Sussex
Parish Council